Club Santa Catalina Atlético is a football team based in Palma, Majorca in the autonomous community of Balearic Islands. It plays in Tercera División – Group 11, holding home matches at the Camp Municipal de Son Flo, which has a capacity of 1,000 spectators.

Season to season

5 seasons in Tercera División

External links
Soccerway team profile

Football clubs in the Balearic Islands
1986 establishments in Spain
Association football clubs established in 1986
Sport in Palma de Mallorca